Demonstrations in Physics was an educational science series produced in Australia by ABC Television in 1969. The series was hosted by American scientist Julius Sumner Miller, who demonstrated experiments involving various disciplines in the world of physics. The series was also released in the United States under the title Science Demonstrations.

This program was a series of 45 shows (approximately 15 minutes each) on various topics in physics, organized into 3 units: Mechanics; Heat and Temperature / Toys; and Waves and Sound / Electricity and Magnetism.

Episodes 
Following is a listing of episode titles, as given by the index on one set of the videos (the titles as introduced by Professor Miller during the episode are often different).

Unit 1 - Mechanics 
 Episode 1. The Idea of the Center of Gravity
 Episode 2. Newton's First Law of Motion
 Episode 3. Newton's Second Law of Motion
 Episode 4. Newton's Third Law of Motion
 Episode 5. Energy and Momentum
 Episode 6. Concerning Falling Bodies and Projectiles
 Episode 7. The Simple Pendulum, Oscillating Things
 Episode 8. Adventures with Bernoulli
 Episode 9. Soap Bubbles and Soap Films
 Episode 10. Atmospheric Pressure - Properties of Gases
 Episode 11. Centrifugal Force and Other Strange Matters
 Episode 12. The Strange Behavior of Rolling Things
 Episode 13. Archimedes' Principle
 Episode 14. Pascal's Principle - The Properties of Liquids
 Episode 15. Levers, Inclined Planes, Geared Wheels and Other Machines

Unit 2, Part I - Heat and Temperature 
 Episode 16. The Ideas of Heat and Temperature
 Episode 17. Thermometric Properties and Processes
 Episode 18. How to Produce Heat Energy
 Episode 19. Thermal Expansion of Stuff - Solids
 Episode 20. Thermal Expansion of Stuff - Gases, Liquids
 Episode 21. The Strange Thermal Behavior of Ice, Water
 Episode 22. Heat Energy Transfer by Conduction
 Episode 23. Heat Energy Transfer by Convection
 Episode 24. Heat Energy Transfer by Radiation
 Episode 25. Some Extraordinary Adventures (Evaporation, Boiling, Freezing)
 Episode 26. Some Miscellaneous and Wondrous Adventures in the Subject of Heat
 Episode 27. Extraordinarily Cold Stuff

Unit 2, Part II - The Physics of Toys 
 Episode 28. The Physics of Toys: Mechanical
 Episode 29. The Physics of Toys: Acoustic and Thermal
 Episode 30. The Physics of Toys: Electrostatic, Magnetic and Miscellaneous

Unit 3, Part I - Waves and Sound 
 Episode 31. Waves: Kinds and Properties
 Episode 32. Sound Waves - Sources of Sound
Frequency, pitch, how they relate to each other and correspond to musical notes.
Vibrating systems cause sound, sound requires a medium to travel.
Flexing different metal plates to produce different pitches.
Rotating plate with drilled holes and air blown through them – difference in sound between symmetrically drilled ones (music) and asymmetrically drilled ones (noise).
Vibrating a meter stick at different frequencies when different lengths stick out past a table.
Varying frequencies rubbing a thumbnail across the milled edge of a coin, when tearing various pieces of cloth, using different files on wood, or riffling a deck of cards.
Human hearing range (16 Hz to 16 kHz)
Nodes in vibrating bars and tuning forks.
Notched stick with a spinning propeller.
Turing an orchestra – why they don’t use a piano.
 Episode 33. Vibrating Bars and Strings
Bar mounted on a resonating chamber, mounted at 2 important places.
Second, "identical" bar, beats between two bars that are 1 Hz out of tune.
Beats between two tuning forks, one with rubber bands around the end of a prong to reduce its frequency.
Vibrations of a metal bar, shown on screen with a long pipe.
If a vibrating bar is grasped at the nodes it will keep vibrating, anywhere else it will stop.
Nodes on a vibrating bar are 0.224 of the bar length from each end.
Tuning forks on resonant boxes – transferring vibration from one to another (didn’t work).
Musical sticks.
Forming standing waves on a string, changing the number of nodes and antinodes at constant frequency and length by changing the tension.
Transferring vibrations from one vibrating bar to another through resonance.
 Episode 34. Resonance - Forced Vibrations
 Episode 35. Sounding Pipes
 Episode 36. Vibrating Rods and Plates
 Episode 37. Miscellaneous Adventures in Sound

Unit 3, Part II - Electricity and Magnetism 
 Episode 38. Electrostatic Phenomena
 Episode 39. Adventures with Electric Charges
 Episode 40. Adventures in Magnetism
 Episode 41. Ways to "Produce" Electricity
 Episode 42. Properties and Effects of Electric Currents
 Episode 43. Adventures in Electromagnetism
 Episode 44. Further Adventures in Electromagnetism
 Episode 45. Miscellaneous and Wondrous Things in Electricity & Magnetism

External links 
 The Internet Movie Database (IMDB) entry for Demonstrations in Physics

1960s Australian documentary television series
Science education television series
Physics education
Australian Broadcasting Corporation original programming
1969 Australian television series debuts